Francisco Javier Lledó Llano (born 11 July 1979) is a Spanish former professional footballer who played as a goalkeeper.

He played 59 matches in Segunda División for four clubs, and 223 in Segunda División B in service of five.

Club career
Born in Coria del Río, Province of Seville, Lledó began his career at hometown team Coria CF in Segunda División B. After suffering relegation in 2002 he transferred to Atlético Madrid, playing at the same level for their reserves for the next two years.

Lledó joined Real Valladolid in 2004, being initially only used in the Copa del Rey and helping to an away-goals victory over the Galácticos of Real Madrid in the last 16. He finally made his professional debut on 22 May 2005, keeping a clean sheet in a 3–0 Segunda División win against Atlético Malagueño.

On 31 January 2007, Lledó left for second division club Real Murcia for the remainder of the season, playing understudy to Antonio Notario as they won promotion. After two years at AD Ceuta one league below, he signed a two-year contract at CD Castellón on 17 July 2009, featuring regularly in an eventual relegation from division two.

Until his retirement in 2013 at the age of 34, Lledó alternated between the second and third tiers, representing Xerez CD, Real Oviedo and Albacete Balompié.

References

External links

1979 births
Living people
People from Coria del Río
Sportspeople from the Province of Seville
Spanish footballers
Footballers from Andalusia
Association football goalkeepers
Segunda División players
Segunda División B players
Coria CF players
Atlético Madrid B players
Real Valladolid players
Real Murcia players
AD Ceuta footballers
CD Castellón footballers
Xerez CD footballers
Real Oviedo players
Albacete Balompié players